Geek humor  may refer to:

Humor of or about geeks
Computer humor
Internet humor
Mathematical joke